Over the Hump is the eighth regular studio album by European-American pop group The Kelly Family. Co-produced by Hartmut Müller and Kathy Kelly and recorded at the Sound Studio N in Cologne, it was released on 26 August 1994 throughout most of Europe. The album reached number-one in Austria, Germany and Switzerland, resulting in the group's breakthrough in German-speaking Europe after years of minor successful studio and live releases. It peaked at 17 in their native Ireland and also entered the top 30 in the Netherlands, Norway and Spain and sold more than 1.8 million copies within the first five months of its release.

Over the Hump eventually sold more than 2.25 million copies in Germany alone, making it one of the biggest-selling albums of German origin to date. It produced the band's first number-one hit single, "An Angel", and yielded three further top twenty singles "Why Why Why", "Roses of Red" and "First Time". In 2019, The Kelly Family produced the studio album 25 Years Later to commemorate with the release of Over the Hump.

Track listing

Personnel
Credits are taken from the album's liner notes.

Instruments and performances

 Johann Daansen – bass guitar, guitar, keyboards
 Angelo Kelly – vocals, drums
 Barby Kelly – vocals
 Jimmy Kelly – vocals, bass guitar, acoustic guitar, drums, percussions, accordion
 Joey Kelly – vocals, electric guitar
 John Kelly – vocals, acoustic guitar, drums

 Kathy Kelly – vocals, piano, keyboards, accordion, hurdy gurdy
 Maite Kelly – vocals
 Paddy Kelly – vocals, guitar, electric guitar, drums, keyboards, flute
 Patricia Kelly – vocals, bombo
 Hartmut Pfannmüller – drums

Technical and production

 Album producers: Dan Kelly, Kathy Kelly, Paddy Kelly
 Executive producers: Dan Kelly, Mike Ungefehr
 Writing: The Kelly Family
 Recording: Günther Kasper 
 Mastering: Radu Marinescu, Pfannmüller

 Mixing: Pfannmüller
 Mixing assistance: Kathy Kelly, Ungefehr
 Photography: Thomas Stachelhaus
 Hairstyling: Uschi Ries
 Cover design: Dan Kelly and so.wie?.so!

Charts

Weekly charts

Year-end charts

Certifications

References

External links
 KellyFamily.de – official website

1994 albums
The Kelly Family albums